is a three-record greatest hits album by Japanese duo Pink Lady. The album was released on March 21 1981, ten days before their farewell concert. It contains the duo's singles and B-sides from 1976 to 1981, as well as previously unreleased tracks. The original LP release featured a silver embossed sleeve and exclusive photos of the duo.

Track listing 
All lyrics are written by Yū Aku, except where indicated; all music is composed and arranged by Shunichi Tokura, except where indicated.

Charts

References

External links

1981 greatest hits albums
Japanese-language compilation albums
Pink Lady (band) compilation albums
Victor Entertainment compilation albums